Domiporta valdacantamessae is a species of sea snail, a marine gastropod mollusk, in the family Mitridae, the miters or miter snails.

Distribution
This species occurs in Queensland.

References

valdacantamessae
Gastropods described in 2017